The Venerable George Savage was an Anglican priest in the late 16th and early 17th  centuries.

Savage was educated at Christ Church, Oxford. He held livings at Sedgeberrow, Tolleshunt Major, Saintbury and Dursley Robinson was Archdeacon of Gloucester from 1575 until his death in 1602.

Notes 

1602 deaths
Alumni of Christ Church, Oxford
Archdeacons of Gloucester
16th-century English Anglican priests
17th-century English Anglican priests